Paulo César Vieira Rosa (born 28 September 1963), known as Paulinho McLaren or simply Paulinho, is a Brazilian football manager and former player who played as a forward. He is currently under contract with São Caetano.

Paulinho, who was born in Igaraçu do Tietê, Brazil, was top scorer for the 1991 Brazilian Serie A with 15 goals, while he played for Santos FC, and in 1994, he was the top scorer in the Brazil Cup with 6 goals, while he played for Internacional. In 1999, he retired, after playing for Santa Cruz.

He got the nickname McLaren in 1991, when he celebrated a goal after Formula 1 driver Ayrton Senna, who was driving for McLaren at the time.

Club statistics

Honors
 Porto
 Primeira Liga: 1992-93
 Supertaça Cândido de Oliveira: 1991

 Internacional
 Rio Grande do Sul State Championship: 1994

 Cruzeiro
 Gold Cup: 1995

Brazilian League Top Scorer: 1991
Brazil Cup Top Scorer: 1994

References

External links

 Player Player profile at the Brazilian FA database

1963 births
Living people
Brazilian footballers
Brazilian expatriate footballers
Expatriate footballers in Japan
Expatriate footballers in Portugal
Expatriate soccer players in the United States
J1 League players
Major League Soccer players
Campeonato Brasileiro Série A players
Primeira Liga players
Grêmio Esportivo Sãocarlense players
Barretos Esporte Clube players
Clube Atlético Votuporanguense players
Club Athletico Paranaense players
Figueirense FC players
Santos FC players
FC Porto players
Sport Club Internacional players
Associação Portuguesa de Desportos players
Cruzeiro Esporte Clube players
Shonan Bellmare players
Fluminense FC players
Clube Atlético Mineiro players
Miami Fusion players
Santa Cruz Futebol Clube players
Rio Claro Futebol Clube players
Comercial Futebol Clube (Ribeirão Preto) players
Brazilian football managers
União São João Esporte Clube managers
Capivariano Futebol Clube managers
Al-Ta'ee managers
Esporte Clube Taubaté managers
Uberlândia Esporte Clube managers
Association football forwards
Associação Atlética Francana managers
Barretos Esporte Clube managers
Associação Desportiva São Caetano managers
Saudi First Division League managers